City of Sherrill v. Oneida Indian Nation of New York, 544 U.S. 197 (2005), was a Supreme Court of the United States case in which the Court held that repurchase of traditional tribal lands 200 years later did not restore tribal sovereignty to that land. Justice Ruth Bader Ginsburg wrote the majority opinion.

Background

Historical tribal background
The OIN entered three treaties with the United States: Treaty of Fort Stanwix of 1784; The Treaty of Fort Harmar of 1789; and the Treaty of Canandaigua of 1794. These treaties were codified into federal law in the Non-intercourse Act of 1790. The Act also prohibited transacting any sale of Indian Territory without US Congressional consent and ratification.

The OIN and the state entered into another land transaction where the OIN ceded some of their 300,000-acre reservation to the state. The treaty was known as the Treaty of Fort Schuyler. Over the next 200 years, the state continued to purchase OIN land without seeking US Congressional consent and ratification. By 1920, the OIN reservation was only . These transactions forced part of the OIN to move to western lands, e.g. the Oneida Nation of Wisconsin; and the Stockbridge–Munsee and the Brothertown Indians, who also moved from land they owned in New York to Wisconsin.

In 1997 and 1998, the OIN purchased land on the open market that had been part of their aboriginal reservation lands. The city of Sherrill sought to impose property taxes on the land.  The OIN claimed that because the land fell within its aboriginal lands, the OIN could exert its tribal sovereignty of the same; rendering the property tax exempt.  The county of Madison filed a similar suit, Oneida Indian Nation of NY v Madison County.

Prior history
While Sherrill sought relief through eviction proceedings in state court, the OIN sought injunctive relief in federal court.  The  U.S. District Court for the Northern District of New York enjoined the city of Sherrill and Madison County from taxing the tribal property. Both the city of Sherrill and Madison County appealed the decision to the U.S. 2nd Circuit Court of Appeals. The Circuit Court affirmed, holding that the lands at issue fell within the federal definition of Indian Territory and not subject to state or local taxes. The defendants appealed and the Supreme Court granted certiorari.

Opinion of the Court
Justice Ginsburg delivered the opinion of the Court, reversing and remanding.

The Second Circuit found that the land qualified as Indian Territory, which meant it was exempt from state and local taxation.  Justice Ginsburg's decision never overturned that finding.  Instead, Justice Ginsburg held that the OIN purchase of the land did not revive its tribal sovereignty over the land because almost 200 years lapsed where the land was not under OIN control. During this 200-year period, the lands came under state, county, and local jurisdiction. This meant the lands were taxable for property taxes.  The municipalities, the counties, and the state relied on that land's taxable revenue for 200 years. Justice Ginsburg also noted that during this 200-year span, the OIN did not attempt to regain title (ownership) over the land until recently; and even then only a small portion of its original 6,000,000-acre reservation. Because of this, the Court opined that 200 years was too long to be out of OIN ownership.  Therefore, OIN could not reassert its tribal immunity over those lands as an automatic mechanism.

In further support of the decision to overturn, Ginsburg noted that to affirm the lower courts' holdings would cause too much upheaval for the city, the county, and the state who exerted jurisdiction over the land for 200 years without notice that it was not validly done.  Affirming the injunctive relief the OIN sought did not consider the loss of tax revenue to the city. Additionally, Ginsburg opined that because the lands were non-contiguous with existing reservation lands, affirming the injunctive relief would create a "checkerboard" of jurisdictional conflict between the OIN, the state, the city of Sherrill, and Madison County.

These justifications provided by Justice Ginsburg were meant to help those not familiar with the case history to rationalize her decision. The Doctrine of Discovery was cited in the opinion's first footnote as follows:

"Under the “doctrine of discovery,” County of Oneida v. Oneida Indian Nation of N. Y., 470 U. S. 226, 234 (1985) (Oneida II), “fee title to the lands occupied by Indians when the colonists arrived became vested in the sovereign—first the discovering European nation and later the original States and the United States,” Oneida Indian Nation of N. Y. v. County of Oneida, 414 U. S. 661, 667 (1974) (Oneida I)."

Justice Ginsburg concluded that the proper way for the Oneida Nation to reassert its immunity over those re-acquired lands was to place the land in US trust under the Department of the Interior, as authorized by the Indian Reorganization Act of 1934. Justice Ginsburg reasoned that the mechanisms behind the IRA would address issues of jurisdiction, tax revenue loss, and other pertinent issues.  Shortly after the Court published this decision, in April 2005, the OIN applied to the US Interior Department to place  into trust.

Concurring opinion
Justice Souter issued a concurring opinion stating that the amount of time involved from the original transactions to the time of the lawsuit acted as a bar to the tribe from restoring sovereignty to the land in question.

Dissent
Justice Stevens dissented, noting that the majority opinion did not overrule the Second Circuit's determination that the subject land was Indian Territory.  Justice Stevens opined that because the land is within the boundaries of its historical reservation, it was "Indian Country".  Therefore, the city had no jurisdiction to tax that property.

Subsequent history
Sherrill held only that the local governments could tax OIN-owned property that was part of the original reservation but reacquired on the open market, not that the local governments could collect. In 2010, in Oneida Indian Nation of New York v Madison County, NY, the Second Circuit held that tribal sovereign immunity barred a tax foreclosure suit against the tribe for unpaid taxes. As urged by concurring judges José A. Cabranes and Peter W. Hall, the U.S. Supreme Court granted certiorari.  Following a tribal declaration and ordinance waiving sovereign immunity, the Court vacated and remanded.

See also
Oneida Indian Nation of New York State v. Oneida County (1974)
Oneida County v. Oneida Indian Nation of New York State (1985)
Cayuga Indian Nation of N.Y. v. Pataki (2d Cir. 2005)
Oneida Indian Nation of New York v. Madison County, N.Y., 605 F.3d 149 (2d Cir. 2010)

References

Further reading
  
  
 
 
 Sarah Krakoff (2005). "'City of Sherrill v. Oneida Indian Nation of New York': A Regretful Postscript to the Taxation Chapter, in 'Cohen's Handbook of Federal Indian Law,'" Tulsa Law Review 41: 5.
 
 George C. Shattuck (1991). The Oneida Land Claims:  A Legal History.
 Patrick W. Wandres  (2006). "Indian Land Claims, Sherrill and the Impending Legacy of the Doctrine of Laches," American Indian Law Review'' 31:131.

External links
 

United States Constitution Article Three case law
United States Supreme Court cases
2005 in United States case law
Aboriginal title case law in the United States
United States tribal sovereign immunity case law
Oneida
United States Supreme Court cases of the Rehnquist Court
Native American history of New York (state)